Mia Mia is a rural locality in the Mackay Region, Queensland, Australia. In the  Mia Mia had a population of 122 people.

History 
Mia Mia Provisional School opened on 22 January 1900. On 1 January 1909 it became Mia Mia State School. It closed on 7 July 1967.

In the  Mia Mia had a population of 122 people.

References 

Mackay Region
Localities in Queensland